The Isaac Hayes Movement is the third studio album by the American soul musician Isaac Hayes. Released in 1970, it was the follow-up to Hot Buttered Soul, Hayes' landmark 1969 album. Marvell Thomas had come up with "The Isaac Hayes Movement" as a name for Hayes' backup ensemble. He modeled the name after the Jimi Hendrix Experience. Similar in structure to Hot Buttered Soul, The Isaac Hayes Movement features only four long tracks, all with meticulous, complex and heavily orchestrated arrangements. However, unlike the previous album, this time all four songs are reworked covers of others' material. This includes Jerry Butler's "I Stand Accused", which features a nearly five-minute long spoken intro that precedes the actual song, and The Beatles' "Something", which features violin soloing by John Blair. The other two songs included on the album were the Bacharach-David song, "I Just Don't Know What to Do with Myself" and Chalmers and Rhodes' "One Big Unhappy Family".

Released in November 1970, The Isaac Hayes Movement spent a total of seven weeks at #1 on Billboard's Soul Albums chart and remained in the top ten until the last week of November in that year. The album also reached #1 on the Jazz Albums chart and spent 75 weeks on the Billboard 200 chart, peaking at #8. An edited version of "I Stand Accused" was released as a single in July 1970. It reached #23 on the Soul Singles chart and #42 on the Pop chart.

Stax Records reissued The Isaac Hayes Movement in SACD format in 2004.

Track listing

Personnel
 Isaac Hayes – arrangements, keyboards, vocals, producer
 The Bar-Kays – rhythm section
Dale Warren - arrangements
 Pat Lewis – vocal arrangements
Technical
 Joel Brodsky – photography
 Henry Bush – engineer
 Ron Capone – engineer, remixing, remix engineer
 George Horn – mastering
 Herb Kole – art supervisor
 David Krieger – art direction
 Joe Tarantino – mastering
 Ed Wolfrum – engineer

See also
List of number-one R&B albums of 1970 (U.S.)

References

1970 albums
Isaac Hayes albums
Stax Records albums
Albums produced by Isaac Hayes
Albums with cover art by Joel Brodsky